The 2016 Hungaroring GP2 Series round was a GP2 Series motor race held on 23 and 24 July 2016 at the Hungaroring in Mogyoród, Pest, Hungary. It was the sixth round of the 2016 GP2 Series. The race weekend supported the 2016 Hungarian Grand Prix.

Report

Qualifying
Pierre Gasly secured his second pole position of the year in dominant fashion. With a time of 1:25.612, Gasly was over half a second faster than nearest competitor, Sergey Sirotkin. Prema Racing team-mate, Antonio Giovinazzi achieved third with a time eight-tenths adrift of Gasly's time.

Feature Race
Gasly took his second win of the season from Sergey Sirotkin and Antonio Giovinazzi.

Sprint Race
Sirotkin controlled the race to take his first win of the season from the Racing Engineering pair of Jordan King and Norman Nato.

Standings after the round

Drivers' Championship standings

Teams' Championship standings

 Note: Only the top five positions are included for both sets of standings.

See also 
 2016 Hungarian Grand Prix
 2016 Hungaroring GP3 Series round

References

External links 
 Official website of GP2 Series

GP2
Hungaroring
Hungaroring